Boltenia is a genus of ascidian tunicates in the family Pyuridae.

Species within the genus Boltenia include:
 Boltenia africana Millar, 1962 
 Boltenia echinata (Linnaeus, 1767) 
 Boltenia hirta Monniot & Monniot, 1977 
 Boltenia iburi (Oka, 1934) 
 Boltenia ovifera (Linnaeus, 1767) 
 Boltenia pilosa (Millar, 1955) 
 Boltenia polyplacoderma Lambert, 1993 
 Boltenia transversaria (Sluiter, 1904) 
 Boltenia villosa (Stimpson, 1864) 
 Boltenia yossiloya Shenkar & Lambert, 2010

Species names currently considered to be synonyms:
 Boltenia antarctica Beneden & Selys-Longchamps, 1913: synonym of Pyura georgiana (Michaelsen, 1898) 
 Boltenia arctica (Hartmeyer, 1899): synonym of Boltenia echinata (Linnaeus, 1767) 
 Boltenia australiensis Carter, 1885: synonym of Pyura spinifera (Quoy & Gaimard, 1834) 
 Boltenia australis Quoy & Gaimard, 1834: synonym of Pyura australis (Quoy & Gaimard, 1834) 
 Boltenia beringi Dall, 1872: synonym of Boltenia ovifera (Linnaeus, 1767) 
 Boltenia beringia Dall, 1872: synonym of Boltenia ovifera (Linnaeus, 1767) 
 Boltenia bolteni (Linnaeus, 1771): synonym of Boltenia ovifera (Linnaeus, 1767) 
 Boltenia bouvetensis Michaelsen, 1904: synonym of Pyura bouvetensis (Michaelsen, 1904) 
 Boltenia burkhardti Binney, 1870: synonym of Boltenia ovifera (Linnaeus, 1767) 
 Boltenia carnea : synonym of Pyura carnea Brewin, 1948 
 Boltenia ciliata Moeller, 1842: synonym of Boltenia ovifera (Linnaeus, 1767) 
 Boltenia clavata Mueller, 1776: synonym of Boltenia ovifera (Linnaeus, 1767) 
 Boltenia coacta Gould, 1852: synonym of Pyura legumen (Lesson, 1830) 
 Boltenia coarcta Gould, 1852: synonym of Pyura legumen (Lesson, 1830) 
 Boltenia elegans Herdman, 1881: synonym of Boltenia ovifera (Linnaeus, 1767) 
 Boltenia fusiformis Savigny, 1816: synonym of Boltenia ovifera (Linnaeus, 1767) 
 Boltenia georgiana Michaelsen, 1898: synonym of Pyura georgiana (Michaelsen, 1898) 
 Boltenia gibbosa (Heller, 1878): synonym of Pyura gibbosa (Heller, 1878) 
 Boltenia hirsuta (Agassiz, 1850): synonym of Boltenia echinata (Linnaeus, 1767) 
 Boltenia legumen Lesson, 1830: synonym of Pyura legumen (Lesson, 1830) 
 Boltenia microcosmus Agassiz, 1850: synonym of Boltenia ovifera (Linnaeus, 1767) 
 Boltenia oviformis (Linnaeus, 1767): synonym of Boltenia ovifera (Linnaeus, 1767) 
 Boltenia pachydermatina Herdman, 1881: synonym of Pyura pachydermatina (Herdman, 1881) 
 Boltenia pedunculata Hutton, 1873: synonym of Pyura pachydermatina (Herdman, 1881) 
 Boltenia reniformis MacLeay, 1825: synonym of Boltenia ovifera (Linnaeus, 1767) 
 Boltenia rubra Stimpson, 1852: synonym of Boltenia ovifera (Linnaeus, 1767) 
 Boltenia salebrosa Sluiter, 1905: synonym of Pyura bouvetensis (Michaelsen, 1904) 
 Boltenia scotti Herdman, 1910: synonym of Pyura bouvetensis (Michaelsen, 1904) 
 Boltenia spinifera (Quoy & Gaimard, 1834): synonym of Pyura spinifera (Quoy & Gaimard, 1834) 
 Boltenia spinosa (Quoy & Gaimard, 1834): synonym of Pyura spinifera (Quoy & Gaimard, 1834) 
 Boltenia thompsoni Hartmeyer, 1903: synonym of Boltenia ovifera (Linnaeus, 1767) 
 Boltenia tuberculata Herdman, 1891: synonym of Pyura spinifera (Quoy & Gaimard, 1834) 
 Boltenia turqueti Sluiter, 1905: synonym of Pyura bouvetensis (Michaelsen, 1904)

References

Stolidobranchia
Tunicate genera